Little Holm is a small island to the west of South Mainland in Shetland. It is near Scatness and Lady's Holm. A trawler was wrecked there in 1916.

References

 Shetlopedia

Uninhabited islands of Shetland